A list of films produced in Indonesia by year of release. For films produced before 1950, see List of films of the Dutch East Indies.

1950s

1960s

1970s

1980s

1990s

2000s

2010s

2020s

See also
 Cinema of Indonesia

References

External links
 Indonesia film at the Internet Movie Database

Indonesia
Lists of film lists